is a 2010 Japanese mockumentary horror film written and directed by Kōji Shiraishi. It is presented in a found footage style, and concerns a school which is haunted by a wish-granting spirit. Shiraishi appears in a starring role within the film, playing himself, as do the six then-members of the Japanese idol group Momoiro Clover Z.

Plot
Director Kōji Shiraishi wants to film an episode for a Japanese television program, featuring members of the "Idol"-genre singing and dancing ensemble, Momoiro Clover Z (referred to in the film by their previous name, simply Momoiro Clover). The program is one wherein minor celebrity guests are employed to investigate haunted houses and similarly mysterious locales, in an attempt to determine the truth about such places, and their associated paranormal phenomena.  The members of Momoiro Clover are asked to visit an abandoned school, where a shrine to a minor kami known as "Shirome" is located.  This shrine takes the form of a painting that is thought to be that of a butterfly, but which may actually represent the entity's face.

According to local legends, if Shirome is asked to grant a wish, he will do so, but only if the person asking is completely sincere in both their request, and their belief in the existence and power of the Shirome entity.  If any wish is asked of this being in a frivolous manner, or in a spirit of unbelief, Shirome will destroy that person, either through causing them to have a fatal accident, inducing them to commit suicide, or driving them hopelessly insane.

The girls visit the shrine, and request of Shirome that they be granted a chance to appear on a nationwide Japanese television broadcast.  As soon as this wish is pronounced, a series of chaotic disturbances ensue, and a hulking, large, white-eyed being is briefly seen standing (or floating) next to the girls.  Subsequently, their entertainment career becomes characterized by a high degree of popularity and commercial success, but a disturbing video clip taken from immediately after one of their high-profile concerts suggests that their success may have been obtained in an ill-advised manner, and that the young ladies face the possibility of very fearsome, dire consequences in the future, perhaps including the loss of their souls.

See also
Bachiatari Bōryoku Ningen
Chō Akunin
Noroi: The Curse
Occult (film)

References

External links

 (in Japanese)
 (Archived from the original on June 30, 2010.)
 

2010 horror films
2010 films
Found footage films
Japanese horror films
2010s mockumentary films
Films directed by Kōji Shiraishi
Japanese psychological horror films
Japanese supernatural horror films
2010s Japanese films